In Ireland, there are several kinds of public inquiry. A Tribunal of Inquiry, often simply called a tribunal, is a powerful type of statutory inquiry whose procedures are governed by the Tribunals of Inquiry (Evidence) Act 1921 as amended. An Oireachtas inquiry is a less powerful non-statutory inquiry controlled directly by the Oireachtas (parliament). A 2013 proposal to strengthen the power of Oireachtas inquiries was defeated at a referendum. The Law Reform Commission published a report in 2005 examining the operation of public inquiries and recommending changes. A commission of investigation is a different form of inquiry, with evidence generally given in private; provided by the Commissions of Investigation Act 2004 to address scandals relating to medical care and child abuse.

Tribunals of inquiry
Tribunals have been held to address many political controversies, increasing in frequency since the Beef Tribunal of the early 1990s. While they have been the subject of many dramatic revelations in Irish politics, they have also become known for running long beyond their intended length – the longest being the Mahon Tribunal (previously the Flood Tribunal) which began in 1997 and issued its final report in 2013.

The Tribunals of Inquiry (Evidence) Act 1921 was enacted by the United Kingdom of Great Britain and Ireland before the setting up of the Irish Free State and as such remains in Ireland. It has, however, been amended since by several Acts of the Oireachtas. The chair of the inquiry is mandated by the Oireachtas (following resolutions in both the Dáil and the Seanad) to carry out the inquiry into matters of urgent public importance by a Warrant of Appointment. The terms of reference of the inquiry are given as part of that warrant.

Tribunals of Inquiry are established by the Oireachtas where the evidence of malfeasance might not be enough to secure a criminal conviction, but where public policy requires answers. Critics of the system say that tribunals: are relatively toothless; may give witnesses immunity that they would not obtain from a court; allow legal representation to all parties, resulting in a higher final cost to the State than the cost of the original malfeasance; and that they can delay difficult political decisions. The Comptroller and Auditor General published a report in 2008 into the cost of Tribunals of Inquiry and making recommendations. It noted that 50%–85% of the cost of recent tribunals had been legal fees for third parties, as distinct from administration and the tribunal's own legal fees.

Tribunals of Inquiry are invested with the powers, privileges and rights of the  High Court. It is not a function of a Tribunal to administer justice; their work is solely inquisitorial. Tribunals are required to report their findings to the Oireachtas. They have the power to enforce the attendance and examination of witnesses and the production of relevant documents. Tribunals may consist of one or more persons, though the practise has been to appoint a Sole Member. Tribunals may sit with or without Assessors (who are not Tribunal members). Sittings are usually held in public but can, at the Tribunal's discretion, be held in private.

List

Notes

Other inquiries

Non-tribunal official inquiries, and subsequent reports, include:
 2005–2007: Commission of Investigation: Dublin and Monaghan Bombings 1974 (Sole Member: Patrick MacEntee)
 2005: the Travers Report into overcharging of fees at some nursing homes. Between refundable fees and legal costs the Tribunal's findings would cost €500 million.
 2005: the Ferns Report on clerical sexual abuse in the Irish Catholic Diocese of Ferns, County Wexford
 2008: the Baker–Tilly Report into procurement practices at Córas Iompair Éireann
 2000–2009 The Ryan Report (CICA) on child abuse at religiously run institutions
 2006–2009: The Murphy Report on the Sexual abuse scandal in Dublin archdiocese

Bibliography
 
 
  
 
 Reports of particular tribunals of inquiry, listed in the "Report laid" column of the table above.
 Oireachtas debates

References

 
Ireland